The 2018–19 season was Sepahan's 18th season in the Pro League, and their 25nd consecutive season in the top division of Iranian Football and 65nd year in existence as a football club. They competed in the Hazfi Cup. Sepahan was captained by Hossein Papi.

Kit information
Supplier:  StartSponsor: Mobarakeh Steel Company

Players

Updated 20 December 2017.

First-team squad

 

 
 
 

 [U21 = Under 21 year player | U23 = Under 23 year player| U25 = Under 25 year player]

For recent transfers, see List of Iranian football transfers winter 2018–19.

Loan list

Transfers

In 

Updated 26 August 2018.

OUT 

Updated 26 August 2018.

Current managerial staff

Matches

Pro league

League table

Results summary

Results by round

Matches

Statistics

Squad statistics

|}

Goals

1 Exhibition game.

Clean sheets

1 Exhibition game.

References

External links
  Club Official Website
  The Club page in Soccerway.com
  The Club page in Persianleague.com

 
Sepahan